Raghubir  may refer to:

Raghubir Yadav, Indian actor
Raghubir Singh (photographer) (1942–1999), Indian photographer
Raghubir Singh (equestrian), Indian equestrian
Raghubir Singh of Jind (1834–1887), Raja of Jind of the Phulkian dynasty
Raghubir Singh of Bundi (1869–1927), Raja of Bundi
Raghbir Singh Bhola (born 1928), Indian field hockey player
Raghubir Mahaseth, Nepalese politician
Raghubir Sinh, Indian  politician